Boulome is a settlement in Ziguinchor Department in Ziguinchor Region in the Basse Casamance area of south-west Senegal. The population at the 2002 census was recorded as 692.

References

External links
PEPAM

Populated places in the Ziguinchor Department